Canistrum camacaense is a species of bromeliad in the genus Canistrum. This species is endemic to Brazil.

References

camacaense
Flora of Brazil